Mesh are a British electronic alternative band from Bristol, England. They have achieved chart success and recognition in Europe.

Biography
Mesh formed in 1991 after lead singer Mark Hockings and Richard Silverthorn (keyboards) met each other at a concert where Richard Silverthorn's band was playing. Soon afterwards, Neil Taylor, Silverthorn's former bandmate, joined the band on keyboards. The creative writing was split between Richard Silverthorn, who composes the music, and Mark Hockings, who writes the lyrics.

Mesh were signed by the Swedish label Memento Materia and an EP, Fragile, was released in 1994. This was followed by a full album, In This Place Forever, in 1996, and 1997 the band released an extended version of Fragile. A compilation album, Fragmente, was released in 1998, and a new studio album, The Point At Which It Falls Apart in 1999. In 2000 they worked with the German dance producer Mark Oh, releasing the track "Waves", which reached position 83 in the German charts.

In 2002, Mesh were picked up by Sony Records, and released a new album Who Watches Over Me. The band grew in popularity in continental Europe, and most notably in Germany, where their singles and albums repeatedly attained chart positions. In 2006 a new album, 'We Collide', was released, produced by former Depeche Mode producer, Gareth Jones.

On 13 September 2006 Taylor announced he was leaving the band after 15 years to pursue other interests. Hockings and Silverthorn decided to continue as a duo, using an augmented line-up for live shows. Initially, Geoff Pinckney replaced Taylor at live shows.

The new line-up signed to Dependent Records as their European record label. Metropolis Records represents them in the US and South America. A Perfect Solution was released in 2009. It was produced by the German dark electro producer Olaf Wollschläger. Silverthorn stated: "Olaf has a natural talent of tidying up our productions and spending a ridiculous amount of time perfecting them without changing the overall feel and mood". Olaf has continued to work with Mesh on subsequent releases. In 2011 the band followed up A Perfect Solution with a remix of the album, entitled An Alternative Solution. In April 2011, the group toured the United States for the first time, playing on the "Legends of Synthpop" tour with Iris and De/Vision.

On 26 August 2011 the band announced via Twitter that Geoff Pinckney "will no longer be playing live with Mesh", as he wished to focus on his other musical project, Tenek. He was replaced by Richard Broadhead. Live drummer Sean Suleman also joined the line up around this time.

In 2013 the band released Automation Baby, which became the band's most successful album up to that point, entering the German charts at number 33, and topping the European Alternative Charts.

Following this success, the band felt under pressure to deliver with the followup album. When Looking Skyward was released in 2016, it achieved a number 12 position in the German charts, their highest to date.

In 2015 the band played with a classical orchestra at the 'Gothic meets Klassik' festival, hosted at the 'Gewandhaus zu Leipzig' in Leipzig. The show was recorded and initially scheduled for release in 2016. It was later decided to expand the live recording with some additional studio recorded tracks. These were recorded at Tonscheune Oleak, and the release was pushed back to late 2017.

Mesh have acquired a fan base in Germany and Scandinavia, and have also gained notice in North and South American countries. However, success and recognition in their home country of the UK has eluded them. Richard Silverthorn has discussed this in several interviews, stating that while he would love some recognition in the UK, the band has been lucky to find a market for what they do elsewhere and that is now what is important to them.

Discography

Albums

Studio

 In This Place Forever (1996)
 The Point at Which It Falls Apart (1999)
 Who Watches Over Me? (2002) Germany No. 63
 We Collide (2006) Germany No. 90
 A Perfect Solution (2009) Germany No. 89
 Automation Baby (2013) Germany No. 33
 Looking Skyward (2016) Germany No. 12

Compilation and live
 1998: Fragmente (compilation of various tracks with the single Trust You)
 2000: On This Tour Forever (live album)
 2002: Fragmente 2 (compilation)
 2003: Original 91–93 (compilation)
 2011: An Alternative Solution (remix album of A Perfect Solution)
 2017: Live at Neues Gewandhaus Leipzig Germany No. 78

Singles and EPs
 1994: Fragile (EP)
 1997: "You Didn't Want Me"
 1998: "Trust You"
 1999: "People Like Me (With This Gun)"
 1999: "It Scares Me"
 1999: "Not Prepared"
 2000: Live Singles (EP)
 2000: "Waves" (feat. Mark Oh) Germany No. 83
 2002: "Leave You Nothing"
 2003: "Friends Like These" Germany No. 86
 2006: "Crash" DE No. 88
 2006: "My Hands Are Tied / Petrified" Germany No. 95
 2009: "Only Better" Germany No. 84
 2010: "How Long?"
 2011: "From This Height" (EP)
 2013: "Born to Lie"
 2013: "Adjust Your Set"
 2016: "Kill Your Darlings"
 2017: "Runway" (EP)

VHS/DVD
 2000: On This Tour Forever 2006: The World's a Big Place''

References

Musical groups established in 1991
British synth-pop groups
1991 establishments in the United Kingdom
Musical groups from Bristol